New Whiteland is a town in Pleasant Township, Johnson County, Indiana, United States. The population was 5,550 at the 2020 census.

History
New Whiteland had its start when U.S. Route 31 in Indiana was rerouted through the area. It was incorporated as a town in 1954.

On January 19, 1994, the temperature in New Whiteland fell to -36 °F (-38 °C), the coldest temperature ever recorded in the state of Indiana.

Geography
New Whiteland is located at  (39.560104, -86.097387).

Demographics

2010 census
As of the census of 2010, there were 5,472 people, 1,905 households, and 1,489 families living in the town. The racial makeup of the town was 96.6% White, 0.4% African American, 0.1% Native American, 1.0% Asian, 0.5% from other races, and 1.4% from two or more races. Hispanic or Latino of any race were 2.0% of the population.

There were 1,905 households, of which 43.8% had children under the age of 18 living with them, 60.0% were married couples living together, 12.1% had a female householder with no husband present, 6.0% had a male householder with no wife present, and 21.8% were non-families. 17.8% of all households were made up of individuals, and 7.6% had someone living alone who was 65 years of age or older. The average household size was 2.87 and the average family size was 3.22.

The median age in the town was 33.7 years. 29.8% of residents were under the age of 18; 7.6% were between the ages of 18 and 24; 29.6% were from 25 to 44; 22.6% were from 45 to 64; and 10.4% were 65 years of age or older. The gender makeup of the town was 48.6% male and 51.4% female.

2000 census
As of the census of 2000, there were 4,579 people, 1,556 households, and 1,311 families living in the town. The racial makeup of the town was 98.82% White, 0.28% Native American, 0.31% Asian, 0.07% Pacific Islander, 0.13% from other races, and 0.39% from two or more races. Hispanic or Latino of any race were 0.85% of the population.

There were 1,556 households, out of which 44.6% had children under the age of 18 living with them, 70.4% were married couples living together, 10.8% had a female householder with no husband present, and 15.7% were non-families. 12.3% of all households were made up of individuals, and 5.2% had someone living alone who was 65 years of age or older. The average household size was 2.94 and the average family size was 3.18.

In the town, the population was spread out, with 30.6% under the age of 18, 7.4% from 18 to 24, 33.4% from 25 to 44, 19.6% from 45 to 64, and 9.0% who were 65 years of age or older. The median age was 33 years. For every 100 females, there were 93.8 males. For every 100 females age 18 and over, there were 93.9 males.

The median income for a household in the town was $52,907, and the median income for a family was $53,645. Males had a median income of $39,382 versus $26,042 for females. The per capita income for the town was $18,221. About 2.7% of families and 3.0% of the population were below the poverty line, including 4.4% of those under age 18 and 6.6% of those age 65 or over.

Education
New Whiteland is served by the Clark-Pleasant Community School Corporation, including Break-O-Day Elementary School in New Whiteland, Clark-Pleasant Middle School in Greenwood, and Whiteland Community High School in Whiteland.

New Whiteland has a public library, a branch of the Johnson County Public Library.

References

External links
Town of New Whiteland, Indiana website

Towns in Johnson County, Indiana
Towns in Indiana
Indianapolis metropolitan area